The 2006 Skate Canada International was the second event of six in the 2006–07 ISU Grand Prix of Figure Skating, a senior-level international invitational competition series. It was held at the Save-on-Foods Memorial Centre in Victoria, British Columbia on November 2–5. Medals were awarded in the disciplines of men's singles, ladies' singles, pair skating, and ice dancing. Skaters earned points toward qualifying for the 2006–07 Grand Prix Final.

Results

Men

Ladies

Pairs

Ice dancing

External links

 2006 Skate Canada International
 2006 HomeSense Skate Canada International

Skate Canada International, 2006
Skate Canada International
2006 in Canadian sports 
2006 in British Columbia